Suli Daraq may refer to:
 Suli Daraq, Ardabil
 Suli Daraq, Heris, East Azerbaijan Province
 Suli Daraq, Kaleybar, East Azerbaijan Province